Muhammad Siraj-Din (born 11 September 1935) is a Pakistani wrestler. He competed at the 1960 Summer Olympics and the 1964 Summer Olympics.

References

1935 births
Living people
Pakistani male sport wrestlers
Olympic wrestlers of Pakistan
Wrestlers at the 1960 Summer Olympics
Wrestlers at the 1964 Summer Olympics
Sportspeople from Lahore
Asian Games medalists in wrestling
Wrestlers at the 1958 Asian Games
Wrestlers at the 1962 Asian Games
Asian Games silver medalists for Pakistan
Medalists at the 1958 Asian Games
Medalists at the 1962 Asian Games
Commonwealth Games medallists in wrestling
Commonwealth Games gold medallists for Pakistan
Commonwealth Games silver medallists for Pakistan
Wrestlers at the 1958 British Empire and Commonwealth Games
Wrestlers at the 1962 British Empire and Commonwealth Games
20th-century Pakistani people
Medallists at the 1958 British Empire and Commonwealth Games
Medallists at the 1962 British Empire and Commonwealth Games